The women's 50 metre butterfly event at the 2015 European Games in Baku took place on 27 June at the Aquatic Palace.

Results

Heats
The heats were started at 09:42.

Semifinals
The semifinals were started at 17:36.

Semifinal 1

Semifinal 2

Final
The final was held at 19:02.

References

Women's 50 metre butterfly
2015 in women's swimming